The BAFTA Award for Best Film Not in the English Language is given annually by the British Academy of Film and Television Arts and presented at the British Academy Film Awards. The award was first given at the 36th British Academy Film Awards, recognising the films of 1982, and until 1990 was known as the Best Foreign Language Film. Prior to this, films recorded in a language other than English were often recognised in the category BAFTA Award for Best Film, known between 1949 and 1969 as Best Film from any Source, also, in the 1980s there were only European films that the language originally recorded spoken in the film is not English, except Ran, between winners and nominees films in this category.

In the following lists, the titles and names in bold with a dark grey background are the winners and recipients respectively; those not in bold are the nominees. The years given are those in which the films under consideration were released, not the year of the ceremony, which always takes place the following year.

Winners and nominees

1980s

1990s

2000s

2010s

2020s

Multiple winners 
4 director has won the award multiple times.

Awards by nation

Notes

See also
Academy Award for Best International Feature Film
César Award for Best Foreign Film

References

  Awards at British Academy of Film and Television Arts

External links
 BAFTA Awards, IMDb

British Academy Film Awards
 
Lists of films by award
Awards for best film
BAFTA winners (films)